Ambel may refer to:
Ambel, Zaragoza, a municipality located in Aragon, Spain
Ambel, Isère, a commune in the Auvergne-Rhône-Alpes region of southeastern France
Ambel language, or Waigeo, a language of eastern Indonesia 
Eric Ambel (born 1957), American musician